Thomas Anthony Daly (born April 30, 1960) is an American prelate of the Roman Catholic Church. He has been serving as bishop of the Diocese of Spokane in Washington State since May 20, 2015.  He previously served as an auxiliary bishop of the Diocese of San José in California from 2011 to 2015.

Biography

Early life
Thomas Daly was born on April 30, 1960, in San Francisco, California. He attended St. Patrick Seminary in Menlo Park, California.  Daly earned his bachelor degree from the University of San Francisco in 1982.  In 1987, he received a Master of Divinity degree from St. Patrick's Seminary and University in Menlo Park.  In 1996, Daly obtained a Master of Education degree from Boston College.

Priesthood
Daly was ordained to the priesthood by Archbishop John Quinn for the Archdiocese of San Francisco on May 9, 1987. He served as a curate at Our Lady of Loretto Parish in Novato, California, and later as a teacher and campus minister at Marin Catholic High School in Kentfield, California. Later, Daly served as part-time chaplain to the San Francisco Police Department while concurrently posted as curate at Saint Cecilia Parish in San Francisco. 

After these assignments, Daly became involved in the archdiocesan vocations office; serving concurrently as director of vocations and president of Marin Catholic High School.

Auxiliary Bishop of San Jose

Daly was named auxiliary bishop of the Diocese of San Jose and titular bishop of Tabalta by Pope Benedict XVI on March 16, 2011. He attended his first diocesan event at the mass in celebration of the 30th anniversary of the Diocese of San Jose, and was consecrated bishop on May 25, 2011, at the Cathedral Basilica of Saint Joseph by Bishop Patrick McGrath of San José, with Archbishop George Niederauer and Bishop George Thomas co-consecrating in the presence of Cardinal Roger Mahony.

On September 16, 2013, Archbishop Salvatore Cordileone named Daly as the interim president/rector of the archdiocese seminary. This was the first time in the history of the seminary that the rector has not been a member of the Society of St. Sulpice. Daly, who is also on the seminary's board of directors, served as rector until the Sulpicians nominated a new rector/president, Father Gladstone Stevens.

Bishop of Spokane
On March 12, 2015, Daly was appointed by Pope Francis as bishop of the Diocese of Spokane.  Daly was installed on May 20, 2015.

On January 30, 2017, Daly criticized the Trump Administration ban on the admission of refugees from the Syrian Civil War into the United States. In March 2017, Daly banned Otto Koltzenburg, a retired priest, from participating in ministry, based on credible accusations that he sexually abused a 10 year old altar boy between 1984 and 1986 in Spokane. On February 4, 2019, Daly stated that Catholic politicians who support abortion rights for women should be denied communion in the diocese until they are "reconciled to Christ and the Church".

In a February 19, 2020, statement, Daly wrote that he was concerned by the Gonzaga University School of Law's establishment of an LGBTQ+ Rights Clinic without first consulting him. The clinic's stated aims are "to advance the equal rights and dignity of individuals who identify as LGBTQ+ through education, programming, advocacy, research, and legal representation." In his statement Daly speculated that the clinic might bring the law school "into conflict with the religious freedom of Christian individuals and organizations," and expressed fear that it "will be actively promoting, in the legal arena and on campus, values that are contrary to the Catholic faith and Natural Law."

In June 2020, Dr. Rob McCannthe head of Catholic Charities of Eastern Washingtonposted a video in which he endorsed the Black Lives Matter movement and described the Catholic Church as racist. In the video, he stated that "For me, as a White person, saying 'I'm not a racist' is like saying 'a fish is not wet'" and that "My Catholic Church and my Catholic Charities organization is racist... Our Catholic faith tradition was built on a tradition that a baby born in a manger in the Middle East was a White baby." Daly responded by meeting with McCann, and subsequently posting a statement explaining his disapproval of McCann's words, condemning the violence at some of the George Floyd protests, and pointing out that "BLM is in conflict with Church teaching regarding marriage, family and the sanctity of life." In the same statement, Daly decried the "horrific and unjustified" murder of George Floyd and outlined steps to be taken in conjunction with Catholic Charities towards addressing racism.

See also

 Catholic Church hierarchy
 Catholic Church in the United States
 Historical list of the Catholic bishops of the United States
 List of Catholic bishops of the United States
 Lists of patriarchs, archbishops, and bishops

References

External links

Roman Catholic Diocese of Spokane Official Site
Diocese of San Jose Blog

Episcopal succession

 

21st-century Roman Catholic bishops in the United States
Roman Catholic Diocese of San Jose in California
Clergy from San Francisco
1960 births
Living people
Catholics from California